The decade of the 1650s in archaeology involved some significant events.

Explorations

Excavations

Finds

Publications
 1655: William Dugdale - Monasticon Anglicanum begins publication.
 1656: William Dugdale - Antiquities of Warwickshire.
 1658: Thomas Browne - Hydriotaphia, Urn Burial, or a Discourse of the Sepulchral Urns lately found in Norfolk.

Deaths
 1652: 8 October - John Greaves, English mathematician, astronomer and antiquary  (b. 1602)

References

Archaeology by decade
Archaeology